Brian Marcee Williams (born December 17, 1972) is a retired American football linebacker in the National Football League.

College career
Williams played college football at the University of Southern California.

Professional career
Williams played for the Green Bay Packers, the Detroit Lions and the New Orleans Saints between 1995 and 2002.

External links
NFL.com player page

1972 births
Living people
Players of American football from Dallas
American football linebackers
USC Trojans football players
Green Bay Packers players
New Orleans Saints players
Detroit Lions players
Ed Block Courage Award recipients